Nasir al-Din (Arabic:  or  or , 'Defender of the Faith') was an honorific title, and is an Arabic masculine given name. 

Nasir al-Din or variant spellings may also refer to:

Nasir ad-Din, Tiberias, a former Palestinian Arab village
Nasr ol Din, a village in South Khorasan Province, Iran
Nasireddin (crater), on the moon
Nasreddin (crater), on Pluto's moon Charon

See also

ad-Din, a suffix component of some Arabic names
Molla Nasraddin, an early 20th century Azerbaijani satirical periodical 
Nasreddin in Bukhara, a 1943 Soviet comedy film
Nasrettinhoca, a town in Eskişehir Province, Turkey